The Dunsink Observatory is an astronomical observatory established in 1785 in the townland of Dunsink in the outskirts of the city of Dublin, Ireland.

Dunsink's most famous director was William Rowan Hamilton, who, amongst other things, discovered quaternions, the first non-commutative algebra form, while walking from the observatory to the city with his wife. The annual Hamilton Walk that commemorates this discovery begins at the observatory. He is also renowned for his Hamiltonian formulation of dynamics.

History
The observatory was established by an endowment of £3,000 in the will of Francis Andrews, who was Provost of Trinity College Dublin at his death on 18 June 1774. The site was established on the south slope of a low hill in the townland of Dunsink, 84m above sea level. The South Telescope, a 12-inch Grubb instrument, is a refracting (i.e. it uses lens) telescope built by Thomas Grubb of Dublin, completed in 1868. The achromatic lens, with an aperture of 11.75 inches, was donated by Sir James South in 1862, who had purchased the lens from Cauchoix of Paris 30 years earlier. He had intended it for a large but troubled equatorial that came to fruition in the 1830s, but was dismantled around 1838. (See also Great refractors)

The entry for the observatory in Thom's Directory (1850) gives the following account of the observatory,

Dublin Mean Time, the official time in Ireland from 1880, was the mean solar time at Dunsink, just as Greenwich Mean Time (GMT) was the mean solar time at Greenwich Royal Observatory near London. In 1916, Ireland moved to GMT. In 1936, Trinity College stopped maintaining the observatory and rented out the land. 

Éamon de Valera, who had driven the establishment of the DIAS in 1940, added a School of Cosmic Physics to it in 1947, partly in order to revive the observatory, for which it was given responsibility.

The named chair Andrews Professorship of Astronomy was associated with the directorship of Dunsink Observatory during the time that the observatory was part of Trinity College Dublin (TCD).

By the late 20th century, the city encroached ever more on the observatory, which compromised the seeing. The telescope, no longer "state of the art", is now used mainly for public 'open nights'.

The observatory is currently part of the Dublin Institute for Advanced Studies (DIAS). It provides accommodation for visiting scientists and is also used for conferences and public outreach events. Public talks on astronomy and astrophysics are given regularly at the observatory by professional and amateur astronomers. Stargazing events are also held using the Grubb telescope.

Directors of the observatory

In fiction 
The observatory is one of the locations featured in the book, The Coroner's Daughter by Andrew Hughes, which was selected as the Dublin UNESCO City of Literature One City One Book for 2023.

See also
Dublin Institute for Advanced Studies
List of astronomical observatories

References

Sources

Citations

External links
Dunsink Observatory
Astronomy Trail

Astronomical observatories in the Republic of Ireland
Dublin Institute for Advanced Studies
Buildings and structures in Dublin (city)
Time in Ireland
Time in the Republic of Ireland
Tourist attractions in Fingal